Mike Anthony is a British lovers rock singer, who began his career in the late 1980s.

History
He was born in Lewisham, London, England.

Anthony's early recordings were produced by Barry Boom, and he had a reggae top ten hit with "Crash Crash", which was followed by further successes with "Glide Gently", "Cruising in Love", and "Open Your Heart". He moved on to Fashion Records and had another hit with "Still Your Number One", before topping the reggae chart for several weeks with a cover of David Ruffin's "Walk Away From Love". Further hits in the UK reggae chart followed throughout the 1990s and 2000s with songs such as "No Halfway Love", "Spread Love", "Sexy Eyes", "How Long", "Don't Play Games", and "Call Me". Along with Peter Hunnigale, Anthony has achieved virtual superstar status among lovers rock followers, and has appeared at Jamaica's Reggae Sunsplash festival.

Album discography
The Album Juggling
Short of Nothing (1992) Merger
Back 4 More (1996) Gussie P
Natural (2000) Gussie P

References

Living people
British male singers
British reggae singers
Year of birth missing (living people)
Musicians from London
People from Lewisham